SONO (Lat.: make a sound; be heard; Esperanto: sound) is a band from Hamburg, Germany and was started in 2001 by Lennart A. Salomon (vocals, Guitar) Florian Sikorski (Keyboards) and Martin Weiland (Keyboards, DJ).

Stylistically, SONO is somewhere between Pop and Electronica.

History and Characteristics
F. Sikorski and M. Weiland have been producing music together since 1995 and pursuing careers within the music industry. F. Sikorski is a sound engineer and runs a music studio, "Maratone Music." Madonna, Britney Spears and Kelly Clarkson, among others, have recorded and mixed there. M. Weiland is active in the commercial music business in labels and sales.

L. A. Salomon, originally a drummer, singer and guitarist for a large number of local bands around Hamburg, joined in 2001, marking the founding of SONO. He works as a composer and musician and runs, among other things, the funk and rock band project Jerobeam.

Musically, SONO could be categorized widely as pop, with strong influences from techno, house, and electro. This musical diversity has provided SONO with a considerable number of fans from various music scenes.

Aside from studio projects, SONO performs in various live constellations, from DJ live sequencing sets to stage performances including a large rhythm section.

Discography

Albums
 Solid State (2002; Zeitgeist/Polydor)
 Live In Cologne (2005) (iTunes exklusiv)
 Off (2005; PIAS)
 RMXD (2006; PIAS)
 Panoramic View (2007; PIAS)
 Plus (2009; Kontor Records)
 Backyard Opera (2016; Kontor Records)
 Human (2018; Kontor Records)

Singles

Awards
 Keep Control: Billboard: 2001 Year-End Chart-Toppers "Top Hot Dance Club Play Singles" #01

Literature
Astrid Vits: Du und viele von deinen Freunden 1. 34 deutsche Bands und Solo-Künstler im Interview. Schwarzkopf & Schwarzkopf, Berlin 2004,

References

External links
 Official MySpace (German)
 Biography on Laut.de (German)

German pop music groups